The Naama War  is a fantasy novel written by Charles R. Saunders, and published independently in 2009 by Sword & Soul Media via the online press Lulu.

Synopsis
Warfare on a cataclysmic scale is convulsing across the continent of Nyumbani, from north to south. Soldiers fall. Cities burn. Blood reddens the sea. Sorcery sears the land. Deities gather in opposite dimensions, poised to unleash unimaginable cosmic power on a land already battered by the Cushites of the North and the Naamans of the South.

In the midst of this massive struggle, Imaro, warrior of the Ilyassai, wages a personal war against his nemesis, the sorcerer Bohu of Naama. This individual vendetta mirrors the larger clash between the forces of good and evil – a confrontation that threatens to tear Nyumbani apart.

The destiny for which Imaro has been honed like a living weapon, now lies directly before him. Imaro vs. Bohu. Cush vs. Naama. War. Magic. Blood. Fire. The losers in this wide-ranging battle for the fate of a continent face oblivion. But the winners will not emerge unscathed.

List of characters
The characters in this section are listed in their order of appearance.

Imaro - son of Katisa, an Ilyassai warrior decreed Benemetapa (heir) of the Monomotapa Empire
Pomphis -  Bambuti Pygmy scholar and former jester, now friend to Imaro
Bohu - servant of the Erriten, Imaro's nemesis
King Majnun - deposed king of Kitwana and former friend of Pomphis
Solosha - Imaro's cousin and his closest friend among the Ngikwa, his fathers people
Mkwayo - Imaro's father and Monomotapa (Emperor) of the Monomotapa Empire
Katisa - Imaro's mother now Dakamatapa (Empress/Queen) of the Monomotapa Empire
Kilewo - son of Imaro, five rains old
Tanisha - a Shikaza woman who becomes Imaro's companion

Footnotes

External links
Charles R. Saunders official website
  

2009 American novels
American fantasy novels
Novels by Charles R. Saunders